Pennsylvania Route 965 (PA 965) is an  state highway located in Mercer County and Venango County, Pennsylvania.  The route terminates at each end at U.S. Route 62 (US 62). In the west, it begins in Jackson Township, before traveling through rural areas to its end in Frenchcreek Township.

Route description

PA 965 begins at an intersection with US 62 in the community of Nesbits Corners in Jackson Township, Mercer County, heading east-northeast on two-lane undivided Henderson Road. The road passes through a mix of farms and woods with some homes before passing through open agricultural areas and crossing into Worth Township. The route becomes Jackson Center Polk Road and runs through wooded areas with some fields and residences, crossing PA 173 in Perrine Corners. Past this intersection, PA 965 heads northeast through more rural areas and passes through Henderson. PA 965 enters Mineral Township in Venango County and heads through forested areas with some homes, passing through the community of Mount Pleasant. The road continues northeast through more woodland with some farmland and residences. Farther northeast, PA 965 crosses the Sandy Creek into Frenchcreek Township and ends at another intersection with US 62 in Waterloo Bridge.

Major intersections

See also

References

External links

Pennsylvania Highways: PA 965

965
Transportation in Mercer County, Pennsylvania
Transportation in Venango County, Pennsylvania